Kiowa Joseph Gordon (born March 25, 1990) is an American actor of Hualapai descent. He is best known for his role as shapeshifter Embry Call in The Twilight Saga, as well as Junior in the TV series The Red Road.

Early life 
Gordon was born in Berlin, Germany, where his father, Thomas Gordon, was working. He is the seventh of eight children (Mac, Sean, Aaron, Josh, Cheyenne, Sariah, Lakota). His mother, Camille Nighthorse Gordon, is also an actress. Gordon is partly of Hualapai Native American descent, and is a member of the Hualapai tribe of Northern Arizona.

His family moved back to the U.S. when he was two years old, and he grew up in Arizona, where he attended Cactus Shadows High School in Cave Creek, Arizona. He attended the LDS church for a while in the same ward as Twilight author Stephenie Meyer. Aside from acting, Kiowa is also a vocalist, and used to be a member of a progressive metal band called Touché, leaving it to focus on acting.

Career 
In 2009, Gordon played shapeshifter Embry Call in New Moon, based on Stephenie Meyer's novel of the same name. Kiowa has said that he was approached one day at church by Stephenie Meyer as she thought he would be perfect for the wolf pack. He then attended an open casting where he landed the role of Jacob Black's best friend. Gordon replaced Krys Hyatt (who played Embry in Twilight) in New Moon, Eclipse, and Breaking Dawn.

Gordon was set to play Brad in the proposed American film Into The Darkness, but the film never came to fruition. Gordon portrayed Jake Kingston in the 2014 thriller Wind Walkers, which tells a Native American Urban legend. Gordon starred in An Act of War, released on Netflix in 2015. The film was directed by Ryan M. Kennedy and produced by Atit Shah.

In 2021, it was announced that Gordon will star as Jim Chee in Dark Winds, a psychological thriller television series on AMC. It premiered on 12 June 2022 and have received a renewal for a second season.

Filmography

Film

References

External links
 

1990 births
American male film actors
Hualapai people
Living people
Native American male actors
Native American actors
21st-century American male actors
Latter Day Saints from Arizona
American expatriates in Germany
People from Cave Creek, Arizona
American male television actors